Æthelweard, also spelled Ethelweard, Aethelweard, Athelweard, etc., is an Anglo-Saxon male name. It may refer to:

 King Æthelweard of the Hwicce (fl. 7/8th century)
 King Æthelweard of East Anglia (fl. mid-9th century)
 Æthelweard (son of Alfred) (fl. 9/10th century), younger son of King Alfred and Ealhswith
 Æthelweard (bishop of Sherborne) (d. c. 909)
 Æthelweard of London (d. c. 915), bishop of London
 Æthelweard (historian) (fl. late 10th century), also known as Fabius Æthelweard, ealdorman and historian

Old English given names
Masculine given names